The 2013 Slavic Cup is a regional invitational tournament for national teams in women's association football. The tournament was held from 7 to 11 March 2013 in the Croatian cities of Rovinj and Poreč.

Group stage

Group A

Group B

Fifth Place

Third Place

Final

References

Slavic Cup
International association football competitions hosted by Croatia
Slavic
Istria Cup